2018–19 Magyar Kupa is the 60th edition of the Magyar Kupa tournament.

Matches
A total of ... matches will take place, starting with Pre-qualifying on 28 September 2018 and culminating with the Final on 17 March 2019.

Pre-qualifying
The pre-qualifying round ties was scheduled for 29 August – 2 September 2018.

|-

|}

Round of 16

|}

Quarterfinals

|}

References

External links
 Official site

Magyar Kupa Men
Magyar Kupa Men
Volleyball competitions in Hungary